Edward Balcerzan (born in Vovchansk, Kharkiv Oblast, Ukraine, 13 October 1937) is a Polish literary critic, poet, prose writer,  and translator.

Awards
1971 – nagroda czasopisma "Odra" za książkę Oprócz głosu. Szkice krytycznoliterackie. PIW, Warszawa 1971
1989 – nagroda Fundacji Literatury za książkę Poezja polska w latach 1939–1965, cz. II: Ideologie artystyczne. WSiP, Warszawa 1988
1992 — nagroda Fundacji A. Jurzykowskiego w Nowym Jorku w dziedzinie teorii literatury za Przygody człowieka książkowego. (Ogólne i szczególne). PEN, Warszawa 1990
1998 – nagroda Polskiego PEN Clubu za Śmiech pokoleń – płacz pokoleń. Universitas, Kraków 1997
1998 – nagroda "Literatury na Świecie" za książkę Literatura z literatury (strategie tłumaczy). Studia o przekładzie pod red. Piotra Fasta, Nr 6. "Śląsk", Katowice 1998.

Poetry
1960 – Morze, pergamin i ty
1964 – Podwójne interlinie
1969 – Granica na moment. Wiersze, przekłady, pastisze
1972 – Późny wiek. Poezje.

Prose
1964 – Pobyt
1972 – Któż by nas takich pięknych. Tryptyk
2003 – Perehenia i słoneczniki (opisuje ukraińsko-polskie dzieciństwo autora).

Scholarship
1968 – Styl i poetyka twórczości dwujęzycznej Brunona Jasieńskiego. Z zagadnień teorii przekładu
1971 – Oprócz głosu. Szkice krytycznoliterackie
1972 – Przez znaki. Granice autonomii sztuki poetyckiej. Na materiale polskiej poezji współczesnej
1977 – (editor) Pisarze polscy o sztuce przekładu, 1440–1974: Antologia (Polish Writers on the Art of Translation, 1440–1974: an Anthology)
1982 – Kręgi wtajemniczenia. Czytelnik, badacz, tłumacz, pisarz
1982 – Poezja polska w latach 1939–1965. Część 1. Strategie liryczne
1988 – Poezja polska w latach 1939–1965. Część 2. Ideologie artystyczne
1984 – Włodzimierz Majakowski (monografia)
1989 – Liryka Juliana Przybosia
1990 – Przygody człowieka książkowego. (Ogólne i szczególne)
1990 – Poezja polska w latach 1918–1939
1997 – Śmiech pokoleń – płacz pokoleń
1998 – Poezja polska w latach 1939–1968
1998 – Literatura z literatury (strategie tłumaczy) ("Studia o przekładzie", t. 6)
2004 – O nowatorstwie ("Wykłady Schopenhauerowskie", wykład I)
2005 – Zuchwalstwa samoświadomości.
–

See also
List of Poles
Translation

Notes

1937 births
Living people
People from Vovchansk
Polish translators
Polish translation scholars
Recipients of the Gold Medal for Merit to Culture – Gloria Artis
Polish male poets